Wingdings is a series of dingbat fonts that render letters as a variety of symbols. They were originally developed in 1990 by Microsoft by combining glyphs from Lucida Icons, Arrows, and Stars licensed from Charles Bigelow and Kris Holmes. Certain versions of the font's copyright string include attribution to Type Solutions, Inc., the maker of a tool used to hint the font.

None of the characters were mapped to Unicode at the time; however, Unicode approved the addition of many symbols in the Wingdings and Webdings fonts in Unicode 7.0.

Wingdings

Wingdings is a TrueType dingbat font included in all versions of Microsoft Windows from version 3.1 until Windows Vista/Server 2008, and also in a number of application packages of that era.

The Wingdings trademark is owned by Microsoft, and the design and glyph order was awarded U.S. Design Patent D341848 in 1993. The patent expired in 2005. In many other countries, a Design Patent would be called a registered design. It is registration of a design to deter imitation, rather than a claim of a novel invention.

This font contains many largely recognized shapes and gestures as well as some recognized world symbols, such as the Star of David, the symbols of the zodiac, index or manicule signs, hand gestures, and obscure ampersands.

Character set

Wingdings 2

Wingdings 2 is a TrueType font distributed with a variety of Microsoft applications, including Microsoft Office up to version 2010. The font was developed in 1990 by Type Solutions, Inc. The current copyright holder is Microsoft Corporation. Among the features of Wingdings 2 are 16 forms of the index, Enclosed Alphanumerics from 0 to 10, multiple forms of ampersand and interrobang, several geometric shapes and an asterism.

Character set

Wingdings 3

Wingdings 3 is a TrueType dingbat font distributed with Microsoft Office (up to version 2010) and some other Microsoft products.

The font was originally developed in 1990 by Type Solutions, Inc. Currently, the copyright holder is Microsoft Corporation. Wingdings 3 consists almost entirely of arrow variations and includes many symbols for keytops as defined in ISO/IEC 9995-7.

Character set

Controversy

In 1992, only days after the release of Windows 3.1, it was discovered that the characters "NYC" (New York City) in Wingdings was rendered as a skull and crossbones symbol, Star of David, and thumbs up gesture. This was often said to be an antisemitic message referencing New York's large Jewish community. Microsoft strongly denied this was intentional, and insisted that the final arrangement of the glyphs in the font was largely random.  "NYC" in the later-released Webdings font was intentionally rendered as eye, heart, and city skyline, referring to the I Love New York logo.)

After September 11, 2001, an email was circulated claiming that "Q33 NY", which it claims is the flight number of the first plane to hit the Twin Towers, in Wingdings would bring up a character sequence of a plane flying into two rectangular paper sheet icons which may be interpreted as skyscrapers, followed by the skull and crossbones symbol and the Star of David. This is a hoax; the flight numbers of the airplanes that hit the towers were AA11 and UA175; the tail numbers were N334AA and N612UA.

See also
 Dingbat
 Zapf Dingbats
 Webdings
 Unicode symbols
 Zodiac symbols
 Emoji

References

Symbol typefaces
Typefaces and fonts introduced in 1990
Windows XP typefaces
 Typefaces designed by Charles Bigelow (type designer)
 Typefaces designed by Kris Holmes